Lethbridge/Anderson Aerodrome, formerly , was an aerodrome located  southeast of Lethbridge, Alberta, Canada.

References

Defunct airports in Alberta
Transport in Lethbridge